Fatima, also spelled Fatimah, is a female given name of Arabic origin used throughout the Muslim world. Several relatives of the Islamic prophet Muhammad had the name, including his daughter Fatima as the most famous one. The literal meaning of the name is one who weans an infant or one who abstains.

The colloquial Arabic pronunciation of the name in some varieties (e.g., Syrian and Egyptian) often omits the unstressed second syllable and renders it as Fatma when romanized. Incidentally, this is also the usual Turkish and Azerbaijani form of the name (another variant, Fadime, is less common). In South Asian countries, such as India (most commonly), Pakistan, it may be spelt as Fathima. In Persian, the name is rendered as Fatemeh in the Iranian dialect, Fatima in Afghan dialect and Fotima (Фотима) in Tajik dialect.

Fatima is also used by non-Muslims: the town of Fátima, Portugal (originally named after a Moorish princess) was the site of a famous Marian apparition in 1917, after which it achieved some popularity as a female personal name among Catholic populations, particularly in the Portuguese-speaking and Spanish-speaking countries.

Variations
This name has a lot of variations in different languages. The Turkish and Azerbaijani transliteration of the name is either Fatma or Fadime. In Somali the name became Fadumo. It is Faḍma in Kabyle. In South Asia, it is spelt Fathima. Spelled as Fátima, the name is also common amongst Spanish and especially Portuguese speaking peoples in Iberia as well as in the Americas. Due to the Berber influence on Moroccan Arabic, other variations exist in Morocco, such as Fatna, Fadma, Fettoosh, Fattoom.

Fatimah
Fatima, also called "Fatima Zahra" ("Fatima the shining one"), daughter of Prophet Muhammad
Fatimah Abdullah, Malaysian politician
Fatimah Baeshen, Saudi Arabian government official
 Fatimah Baraghani, better known as Táhirih, influential poet and theologian of the Bábí faith in Iran
Fatimah bint Amr, grandmother of Muhammad
Fatimah bint Asad, Muhammad's aunt, the mother of fourth rightly guided caliph Ali bin Abu Talib, and the mother-in-law of Muhammad's daughter, Fatima Zahra
Fatimah bint Husayn, daughter of Husayn bin Ali
Fatimah bint Hizam, the second wife of Ali, cousin of Muhammad
Fatimah bint al-Khattab, sister of Caliph Umar ibn al-Khattab and an early follower of Muhammad
 Fatimah bint Muhammad al-Taymi, was the wife of al-Mansur (r. 754–775) and mother of prince Sulayman.
Fatimah bint Harun al-Rashid, daughter of Caliph Harun al-Rashid and wife of Ja'far ibn Musa al-Hadi.
Fatimah bint Musa, daughter of Musa al-Kadhim and sister of Ali al-Ridha, two of the Twelve Imams
Fatimah bint al-Fath ibn Khaqan also known as Fatimah Khatun bint al-Fath was the spouse of Abbasid caliph Al-Mu'tazz (r. 866–869). She was the daughter of Abbasid official al-Fath ibn Khaqan.
Fatimah binte Sulaiman, Singaporean merchant and philanthropist
Fatimah Khatun, was the wife of Caliph al-Muqtafi (r. 1136–1160)
Fatimah Busu, Malaysian novelist, short-story writer, and academic.
Fatimah Hashim, Malaysian cabinet minister
Fatimah Jackson, American biologist and anthropologist
Fatimah Lateef, Singaporean politician and member of the People's Action Party
Fatimah Rohani binti Ismail, known professionally as Emma Maembong, a Malaysian actress and model
Sayyida Fatimah el-Sharif (1911–2009), queen consort of King Idris of the Kingdom of Libya
Fatimah Tuggar, Nigerian multimedia artist

Fátima
Fátima Aburto Baselga, Spanish physician and politician
Fátima Báñez, Spanish politician, economist and jurist
Fátima Bernardes, Brazilian journalist
Fátima Campos Ferreira, Portuguese television presenter and journalist
Fátima Choi, politician in Macau
Fátima Djarra Sani (born 1968), Guinea-Bissau feminist activist, particularly against female genital mutilation
Fátima Felgueiras, Portuguese politician
Fátima Gálvez, Spanish sport shooter
Fátima Guedes, Brazilian singer and composer
Fátima Leyva, Mexican footballer
Fátima Lopes, Portuguese fashion designer
Fátima Madrid, Spanish swimmer
Fátima Miranda, Spanish singer and researcher
Fátima Moreira de Melo, Dutch field hockey player
Fátima Ptacek, American child actress and model
Fátima Rodríguez (b. 1961), Spanish writer, translator, professor
Fátima Silva, Portuguese long-distance runner
Fátima Veiga, Cape Verdean politician and diplomat

Fatemeh
Fateme Asadi (1960 – 1984), first Iranian 'martyr' women whose body was found during post-war explorations.
Fatemeh Javadi, conservative politician and Vice President of Iran, 2005 – 2009
Fatemeh Haghighatjoo, former parliament deputy, member of opposition party based in US, Cambridge, Massachusetts

Fatimeh
Princess Fatimeh Pahlavi (1928–1987), Iranian princess

Fatima
Fatima al-Budeiri (1923–2009), Palestinian radio broadcaster
Princess Lalla Fatima Zohra (1929–2014), Moroccan princess
Fatima (d. 1246), a favorite of Mongol empress Töregene Khatun and cabinet minister
Fatima bint al-Ahmar (c. 1260–1348), a Nasrid princess in Granada, regents of sultans Muhammad IV and Yusuf I
Fatima Aghamirzayeva (born 1953), Azerbaijani business woman
Fatima Al Zahraa Khachab (born 1999), Lebanese footballer
Fatima Aouam, Moroccan middle-distance runner
Fatima Bhutto, niece of the late Benazir Bhutto
Fatima Jibrell, Goldman Environmental Prize-winning Somali environmentalist
Fatima Jinnah sister of Pakistan's first governor-general, Muhammad Ali Jinnah
Fatima Kuinova, Soviet-Bukharan Jewish singer and "Honored Artist of the USSR"
Fatima Moreira de Melo, Dutch field hockey player
Fatima Rainey, Swedish singer
Fatima Robinson, American choreographer
Fatima Siad, Somali fashion model
Fatima Trotta, Italian actress
Fatima Whitbread, British former javelin thrower and multiple medal-winner
Fatima Yusuf, Nigerian track-and-field athlete

Fatma
Fatma Abdulhabib Fereji, Tanzanian politician
Fatma Ali (born 1950), Tanzanian politician
Fatma Aliye Topuz (1862–1936), Turkish novelist and columnist
Fatma Al-Nabhani, Omani tennis player 
Fatma Atalar (born 1988), Turkish handball player
Fatma Ay (born 1992), Turkish handball player
Fatma Begum, film actress and director from India
Fatma Ceren Necipoğlu (1972–2009), Turkish harpist and university lecture for music
Fatma Danabaş (born 1983), Turlsh para archer
Fatma Ekenoğlu (born 1956), Turkish Cypriot politician
Fatma Gadri, Azerbaijani theatre actress
Fatma Girik (born 1942), Turkish actress and politician
Fatma Işık (born 1991), Turkish-German footballer
Fatma Hikmet İşmen (1918–2006), Turkish agricultural engineer, politician and former senator
Fatma Kachroudi, Tunisian Paralympian athlete 
Fatma Kara (born 1991), Turkish footballer
Fatma Koşer Kaya (born 1968), Dutch politician
Fatma Kurtulan (born 1964), Turkish politician
Fatma Lanouar, Tunisian runner
Fatma Mukhtarova (1893–1972), Azerbaijani opera singer
Fatma Neslişah, paternal granddaughter of the last Ottoman Caliph Abdülmecid II
Fatma Özlem Tursun (born 1988), Turkish female football referee and former women's footballer
Fatma Pesend Hanım Efendi (1876–1924), wife of Ottoman Sultan Abdul Hamid II
Fatma Şahin (born 1966), Turkish politician 
Fatma Şahin (footballer) (born 1990), Turkish footballer
Fatma Salman Kotan (born 1980), Turkish politician
Fatma Samoura (born 1962), United Nations official from Senegal
Fatma Sfar-Ben-Chker (born 1994), Tunisian handball player
Fatma Sultan, several Ottoman princesses
Fatma Uruk (born 1988), Turkish freediver
Fatma Yousif al-Ali (born 1953), Kuwaiti journalist and short story writer
Fatma-Zohra Oukazi (born 1984), Algerian volleyball player
Kara Fatma (1888–1955), Turkish heroine
Lalla Fatma N'Soumer, Algerian activist
Melda Fatma İdrisoğlu (born 1989), Turkish water polo player

Fadime
Fadime Sahindal
Fadime Suna

See also
 Fatima (surname list)
Eye of Fatima
Glossary of Islamic terms in Arabic

References

Given names
Arabic feminine given names
Iranian feminine given names
Turkish feminine given names
Pakistani feminine given names
Portuguese feminine given names
Spanish feminine given names
Bosnian feminine given names
Albanian feminine given names

fa:فاطمه (نام کوچک)